The handover ceremony of Hong Kong in 1997 officially marked the transfer of sovereignty over Hong Kong from the United Kingdom of Great Britain and Northern Ireland to the People's Republic of China. It was an internationally televised event with the ceremony commencing on the night of 30 June 1997 and finishing on the morning of 1 July 1997.  The ceremony was held at the new wing of the Hong Kong Convention and Exhibition Centre (HKCEC) in Wan Chai.

Representatives

 For the People's Republic of China
Jiang Zemin, General Secretary of the Communist Party and President of China
Li Peng, Premier of the State Council
Qian Qichen, Minister of Foreign Affairs and 3rd Vice Premier of the State Council
Tung Chee-hwa, Chief Executive of Hong Kong
General Zhang Wannian, Vice Chairman of the Central Military Commission

 For the United Kingdom of Great Britain and Northern Ireland
Charles, Prince of Wales (representing Queen Elizabeth II)
Tony Blair, Prime Minister and First Lord of the Treasury
Robin Cook, Secretary of State for Foreign and Commonwealth Affairs
Chris Patten, Governor of Hong Kong
General Sir Charles Guthrie, Chief of the Defence Staff

Other guests:
 Margaret Thatcher, former Prime Minister
 Madeleine Albright, Secretary of State of the United States of America
and representatives from more than 40 other countries, including Australia and Japan.

Order of events

Monday, 30 June 1997

 (15:00 Hong Kong Time/07:00 London Time) – Beijing Police cleared more than 60,000 people off Tiananmen Square for the final preparations of the all-night official celebration gala to mark the handover of Hong Kong to the People's Republic of China.
 (16:30 Hong Kong Time/08:30 London Time) – Governor Chris Patten departed from Government House for HMY Britannia after the flag lowering ceremony of the Governor's flag. The bugle call "Last Post" and Patten's favourite pipe tune "Highland Cathedral" was played during the ceremony.
 (17:30 Hong Kong Time/09:30 London Time) – President Jiang Zemin and Premier Li Peng arrived in Hong Kong by Air China Boeing 747 from Shenzhen. 
 (18:15 Hong Kong Time/10:15 London Time) – Sunset farewell ceremony featuring East Tamar Garrison parade on Hong Kong waterfronts. Chris Patten began his final speech as a governor of Hong Kong with "Today is a day of celebration, not sorrow". The bugle call "Sunset" was played for the final time to mark the end of official duties of the British Forces Overseas Hong Kong. Auld Lang Syne and Rod Stewart's Rhythm of My Heart was also performed during the ceremony.
 (18:30 Hong Kong Time/10:30 London Time) – Chinese Foreign Minister Qian Qichen met with British Foreign Secretary Robin Cook.
 (20:45 Hong Kong Time/12:45 London Time) – Prime Minister Tony Blair meets for summit talks with President Jiang Zemin.
 (21:00 Hong Kong Time/13:00 London Time) – About 500 People's Liberation Army vehicles crossed the border from China to Hong Kong. Pro-democracy advocates protest at the Legislative Council in preparation of Chinese rule.
 (21:30 Hong Kong Time/13:30 London Time) – Cocktail reception for 4,000 guests at Hong Kong Convention and Exhibition Centre.
 (22:00 Hong Kong Time/14:00 London Time) – Beijing celebrations including live performances and fireworks were expected to run for 7 hours. The theme of Beijing Blesses you Hong Kong was under preparation.
 (23:45 Hong Kong Time/15:45 GMT) – Handover Ceremony officially begins. The Prince of Wales reads a farewell speech on behalf of Queen Elizabeth II.
 (23:59:00-23:59:47 Hong Kong Time/15:59:00-15:59:47 London Time) – Exactly one minute before midnight the Flag of the United Kingdom and the fourth and final last British colonial flag of Hong Kong (used from 1959-1997) were slowly lowered to the British national anthem "God Save the Queen," symbolizing the end of British colonial rule in Hong Kong as very final and last time. A hiatus of exactly twelve seconds occurred between the British and the Chinese anthems.

Tuesday, 1 July 1997

 (00:00:00 Hong Kong Time/00:00:00 Beijing Time) – Sovereignty of Hong Kong is officially transferred from the United Kingdom to the People's Republic of China. The Flag of the People's Republic of China and the new Hong Kong regional flag were simultaneously raised to the Chinese national anthem "March of the Volunteers", to officially mark the beginning of the Chinese rule in Hong Kong. Chinese leader Jiang Zemin gave a speech expressing his optimism for the "one country, two systems" implementation. Grand celebrations begin in the mainland with fireworks displays over Tiananmen Square.
 (00:15 Hong Kong Time/00:15 Beijing Time) – Charles, Prince of Wales and Governor Chris Patten with his family, bid the citizens of Hong Kong farewell at the Tamar site. They boarded HMY Britannia and sailed to Manila in the Philippines before heading back to the United Kingdom. Prime Minister Tony Blair and other British officials flew out by a British Airways Boeing 777-200ER from Kai Tak Airport to London's Heathrow Airport.
 (01:30 Hong Kong Time/01:30 Beijing Time) – A swearing-in ceremony was held at the HKCEC for various HKSAR officials including Chief Executive Tung Chee-hwa, Chief Secretary for Administration Anson Chan, Financial Secretary Donald Tsang and Secretary for Justice Elsie Leung. 
 (02:45 Hong Kong Time/02:45 Beijing Time) – The provisional legislature held its first meeting after the handover to adopt handover-related laws.
 (06:00 Hong Kong Time/06:00 Beijing Time) – 4,000-People's Liberation Army troops from the Hong Kong Garrison arrive by land, air and sea.
 (10:00 Hong Kong Time/10:00 Beijing Time) – The new Hong Kong government hosted a celebration for 4,600-guests. Newly appointed Chief Executive's Tung Chee-hwa makes his inaugural speech. 
 (16:00 Hong Kong Time/16:00 Beijing Time) – Chinese Premier Li Peng makes a speech at a reception in the Great Hall of the People in Beijing.
 (18:00 Hong Kong Time/18:00 Beijing Time) – Festival Performance by Hong Kong mainland and international celebrities at the Hong Kong Coliseum.
 (19:00 Hong Kong Time/19:00 Beijing Time) – Grand convention and art spectacle begins at the Workers Stadium in Beijing.
 (20:00 Hong Kong Time/20:00 Beijing Time) – The 1997 Hong Kong Spectacular across Victoria Harbour from Causeway Bay to Central, Hong Kong fireworks display begins.

Reactions
In 2005, the British Mail on Sunday revealed Prince Charles's memorandum, of which "Clarence House said only 11 copies were made, circulated to close friends", where he referred to the transfer as the "Great Chinese Takeaway" and the Chinese officials as "appalling old waxworks". In another reported extract, Prince Charles described the ceremony as an "awful Soviet-style" performance and dismissed the speech by Chinese leader Jiang Zemin as "propaganda", complete with loud cheering "by the bussed-in party faithful at the suitable moment in the text." He also ridiculed the People's Liberation Army's goose-steps in the ceremony and claimed his trip on HMY Britannia out of Hong Kong was closely watched by Chinese warships.

The 12-second silence between the British and Chinese anthems has been adapted into the 2019 film My People, My Country.

References

External links
 China News Digest global timeline of the handover

1997 in Hong Kong
1997 in international relations
British Hong Kong
History of Hong Kong
State ritual and ceremonies